Tetragonoderus linealis is a species of beetle in the family Carabidae. It was described by Andrewes in 1938.

References

linealis
Beetles described in 1938